The following lists events that happened during 1991 in Cape Verde.

Incumbents
Prime Minister
Pedro Pires
Carlos Veiga
President:
Aristides Pereira
António Mascarenhas Monteiro

Events
1991 local elections took place
École Internationale Les Alizés opened in Praia 
Newspaper Expresso das Ilhas established in Praia
Newspaper A Semana established in Praia
January 13: the 1991 parliamentary elections took place
February 17: the 1991 presidential elections took place
March 22: President Monteiro took office succeeding Aristides Pereira
April 15: Newspaper Artiletra established

Arts and entertainment
November 15: Cesária Évora's album Mar Azul released

Sports
Sporting Praia won the Cape Verdean Football Championship

Births
January 1: Edivândio, footballer
January 24: Zé Luís, footballer
January 26: Joazimar Stehb, footballer
February 10: Nuno da Costa, footballer
March 21: Djaniny, footballer
April 10: Jorge Kadú, footballer
August 18: Rodirlei José Ascensão Duarte (Rodi), footballer
December 18: Ricardo Gomes, footballer

References

 
Years of the 20th century in Cape Verde
1980s in Cape Verde
Cape Verde
Cape Verde